The Amărăzuia is a left tributary of the river Amaradia in Romania. It flows into the Amaradia near Baloșani.

References

Rivers of Romania
Rivers of Gorj County